WJDT (106.5 FM) is a radio station broadcasting a country music format. Licensed to C & S Broadcasting, the station is currently owned by Cherokee Broadcasting.

References

External links
 
 

Country radio stations in the United States
JDT
Rogersville, Tennessee